Thyrisomidae is a family of mites belonging to the order Sarcoptiformes.

Genera:
 Banksinoma Oudemans, 1930
 Gemmazetes Fujikawa, 1979
 Gobiella Balogh & Mahunka, 1965

References

Sarcoptiformes
Acari families